The Dezna is a river in Arad County, Romania. At its confluence with the river Moneasa in the village Dezna, the river Sebiș is formed. The Dezna is also considered the upper course of the Sebiș.

References

Rivers of Romania
Rivers of Arad County